Majhi may mean:

of, from, or related to Majha, a region in Punjab
 Majhi dialect, the principal dialect of Punjabi
 Majhi language, an Indo-Aryan language of Nepal and Sikkim
 Bote-Majhi language, another Indo-Aryan language of Nepal

People

Given name
Majhi Sawaiyan (born 1981), Indian Olympic archer
Majhi Ramdas Tudu (1854—1951), Indian Santali writer and educator

Surname
Alok Kumar Majhi, Indian politician from West Bengal
Balabhadra Majhi, Indian politician from Odisha
Bhagirathi Majhi (1954–2020), Indian politician from Odisha
Bishnu Majhi (born 1986), Nepali folk singer
Duryodhan Majhi (1938–2022), Indian politician from Odisha
Joba Majhi, Indian politician from Jharkhand
Laxmirani Majhi (born 1989), Indian Olympic archer
Mohan Charan Majhi, Indian politician from Odisha
Parsuram Majhi (born 1961), Indian politician from Odisha
Pradeep Kumar Majhi (born 1976), Indian politician from Odisha
Shankhlal Majhi (born 1955), Indian politician from Uttar Pradesh
Tilka Majhi (1750–1785), Indian Santali freedom fighter